Wheathampstead is a village and civil parish in Hertfordshire, England, north of St Albans. The population of the ward at the 2001 census was 6,058. Included within the parish is the small hamlet of Amwell.

History
Settlements in this area were made about 50 BC by Belgic invaders. They moved up the rivers Thames and Lea from what is now Belgium. Evidence for them was found in Devil's Dyke, at the eastern side of Wheathampstead. The Devil's Dyke earthworks are part of the remains of an ancient settlement of the Catuvellauni and thought to have been the tribe's original capital. The capital was moved to Verlamion (which after the Roman conquest the Romans would rename Verulamium, which in turn would become modern St Albans) in about 20 BC.
Although silver Republican coins dating back to 100 BC are common finds around the verulam settlement. 
The Devil's Dyke is reputedly where Julius Caesar defeated Cassivellaunus in 54 BC, although this claim is disputed. Some historians suggest that the dyke was part of the same defensive rampart as nearby Beech Bottom Dyke, which, if correct, would make the area one of the largest and most important British Iron Age settlements.

Later, the village is recorded in the Domesday Book of 1086 under the name . It appears that a church existed at Wheathampstead before the Norman Conquest, as Wheathampstead was given by Edward the Confessor to Westminster Abbey, but it is very difficult to determine whether any portion of the present St Helen's Church is of Saxon work. The original structure was demolished in the reign of Henry III, the oldest portion of the present church, in the chancel, is assigned to the year 1280.

Some historians have claimed (Trokelowe,  (Rolls Ser.), 78.) that in 1312 the barons who leagued against Edward II and his favourite Piers Gaveston, gathered their troops at Wheathampstead, and whilst there refused to receive emissaries from the Pope, although there seems to be no other documentary evidence of this.

Up until 1859, Wheathampstead and Harpenden were part of a single rectory. Prior to that date, several of the rectors of Wheathampstead-cum-Harpenden after 1238 went on to have unusually successful ecclesiastical careers. Richard Sampson, who held the position in the 16th century, was in 1523 appointed Lord President of Wales, and in 1543 consecrated Bishop of Coventry and Lichfield. Richard Pate, another rector, was in 1554 consecrated Bishop of Worcester. Lambert Osbaldeston was also master of Westminster School, and became more famous later for a controversy with Archbishop Laud; having used libellous language he was, in 1639, deprived of his living and fined £5,000. Henry Killigrew, in 1661, was made Master of the Savoy. John Lambe, whose father mainly devoted his life to the alleviation of the sufferings of prisoners, was also a rector, and was made Chaplain in Ordinary to William III and Mary II. John Wheeldon (1773–1800) was the author of several works, and Queen Victoria's private tutor was also a former rector.

The village is also close to Nomansland common, and slightly further afield, St Albans.

Amwell

About  to the southwest of Wheathamstead and lying within its civil and ecclesiastical parish, the hamlet of Amwell consists of a cluster of cottages and a public house at a crossroads. This small settlement has ancient origins and was first mentioned in 1272 as Hamewell in the records of Westminster Abbey. The name is derived from the Old English language hamm, an enclosure, and weille, a spring. The hamlet has five Grade II listed buildings; four are cottages dating from the 18th century together with the Elephant and Castle pub, whose chimneys may date from the 16th century. A further three houses are locally listed. Amwell became a conservation area in October 1983.

Notable residents
 Rudolph Lambart, 10th Earl of Cavan (1865–1946), Field Marshal and Chief of Imperial General Staff
 Apsley Cherry-Garrard (1886–1959), polar explorer
 Reginald Owen (1887–1972), character actor
 Nick Halling, TV presenter and sports journalist
 Nick Payne, playwright
 William Beach Thomas (1868–1957), author, journalist, war correspondent and writer about country life, lived here in later life and is buried here.
 Michael Ventris (1922-1956), linguist who deciphered Linear B
 Diane Munday, abortion activist

Images

References

Further reading

External links

 Village Website
 Wheathampstead Businesses
 Wheathampstead Wanderers

 
Villages in Hertfordshire
Civil parishes in Hertfordshire
City of St Albans